Adrian Paul Burke (October 2, 1904 in The Bronx, New York City – September 3, 2000 in Lauderhill, Broward County, Florida) was an American lawyer and politician.

Life
He was the son of Thomas F. Burke and Rose Mary (Daw) Burke. He graduated from College of the Holy Cross in 1927, and from Fordham Law School in 1930. He was admitted to the bar in 1932, and commenced practice in New York City. In 1935, he married Edith Martin, and they had three children.

He was Assistant Counsel of the Joint Legislative Committee Investigating Public Utilities in 1936, a delegate to the New York State Constitutional Convention of 1938. He was the founder, and from 1941 to 1953 President, of the Youth Counsel Bureau in the District Attorney's Offices.

In 1953, he managed the mayoral campaign of Robert F. Wagner, Jr., and was appointed by Mayor Wagner to be Corporation Counsel of New York City in 1954.

In 1954, he was elected on the Democratic and Liberal tickets to the New York Court of Appeals, and re-elected in 1968. He resigned from the bench at the end of 1973. In 1974, he was again appointed Corporation Counsel of New York City by Mayor Abraham D. Beame.

He died at his retirement home in Florida.

He wrote his memoirs, published by his son as Everything I Needed: Living and Working in New York (Golden String Press, New York, 2004).

Sources
The History of the New York Court of Appeals, 1932-2003 by Bernard S. Meyer, Burton C. Agata & Seth H. Agata (page 24)
 Court of Appeals judges
A.P. Burke, 95, Appeals Court Judge, Dies in NYT on September 9, 2000

Judges of the New York Court of Appeals
1904 births
2000 deaths
Fordham University alumni
Politicians from New York City
College of the Holy Cross alumni
20th-century American judges
Lawyers from New York City
20th-century American lawyers